Veronika Martinek (born 3 April 1972) is a former professional female tennis player playing for Germany. On 25 March 1991 she reached a career high of No. 49 on the Tour rankings. Her career stretched from the end of the 1980s to 2001.

In 1995, she lost on the 3rd round of Roland-Garros to Adriana Serra Zanetti, this being her best performance in Grand Slam tournaments.

WTA Tour finals

Singles (1 titles, 1 runners-up)

Doubles (1-0)

ITF finals

Singles (1–2)

Doubles (3–0)

References

External links
 
 

1972 births
German female tennis players
Living people
Sportspeople from Ústí nad Labem
West German female tennis players
Czechoslovak emigrants to Germany